A. K. M. Rezaul Karim Tansen (born 7 February 1953) is a Bangladeshi politician and Jatiya Sangsad member representing the Bogra-4 constituency. He belongs to the Jatiya Samajtantrik Dal party.

Early life
Tansen was born on 7 February 1953. He has a B.A. degree.

Career
Tansen was elected to Parliament on 5 January 2014 from Bogra-4 as a Bangladesh Awami League candidate. In 2023 by-election he won against his closest rival Hero Alom in a margin of 824 votes.

References

Living people
1953 births
Jatiya Samajtantrik Dal politicians
10th Jatiya Sangsad members
11th Jatiya Sangsad members